Anatoli Levanis dze Norakidze (30 March 1930 — 27 February 1995) was a Georgian footballer and manager.

Playing career
Born in Ochamchire, Norakidze played youth football for CYSS Ochamchire, before beginning his senior career at Dinamo Ochamchire in 1948. In 1950, Norakidze signed for Dinamo Sukhumi, moving to Spartaki Tbilisi the following year, scoring eight goals in 25 appearances in the Soviet Top League. In 1952, Norakidze moved to TO Tbilisi, scoring six times across two seasons, before rejoining Spartaki Tbilisi in 1953. Norakidze re-signed for TO Tbilisi in 1954. In 1955, Norakidze signed for SKVO Tbilisi. In 1958, Norakidze moved back up to the Soviet Top League, signing for Dinamo Tbilisi, making five appearances in the competition. Norakidze ended his playing career at Tbilisi.

Managerial career
Following his playing career, Norakidze moved into management, managing Gantiadi Tskhakaia for a season in 1961. From 1966 to 1968, Norakidze was manager of Torpedo Kutaisi. In 1969, Norakidze had a short stint as manager of Meshakhte Tkibuli, before moving to Dila Gori the same year. In 1972, Norakidze was appointed manager of Mertskhali Ozurgeti. Norakidze returned to Torpedo Kutaisi for a four-year spell from 1973 to 1977. After departing Torpedo Kutaisi, Norakidze was appointed manager of former club Dinamo Sukhumi. In 1979, Norakidze returned to Torpedo Kutaisi for a third spell. In 1981, Lokomotiv Samtredia appointed Norakidze as manager. In 1983, Norakidze joined Torpedo Kutaisi for a fourth time as manager, departing later that year to rejoin Lokomotiv Samtredia. In 1987, Dinamo Sukhumi re-appointed Norakidze as manager. In 1990, following the withdrawal of Georgian clubs from the Soviet league system, Norakidze was appointed manager of Tskhumi Sukhumi, guiding the club to seventh place in the inaugural Umaglesi Liga season.

In 1991, Norakidze was appointed manager of the Georgia national team. On 2 July 1991, the country achieved their first international victory, beating Moldova 4–2 away in Chișinău. Norakidze presided over the Georgian national team for three more games, winning once and losing twice.

Following his spell managing the national team, Norakidze returned to club management, managing Torpedo Kutaisi and Anci Tbilisi before his death in 1995.

References

People from Ochamchira District
1930 births
1995 deaths
Association football forwards
Soviet footballers
Footballers from Georgia (country)
Football managers from Georgia (country)
Soviet Top League players
Erovnuli Liga managers
FC Dinamo Sukhumi players
FC Spartaki Tbilisi players
FC Dinamo Tbilisi players
FC Torpedo Kutaisi managers
FC Dila Gori managers
FC Samtredia managers